Gomyek-e Sofla (also Romanized as Gomyeh-e Soflá; also known as Gowmyek-e Soflá) is a village in Holayjan Rural District, in the Central District of Izeh County, Khuzestan Province, Iran. At the 2006 census, its population was 40, in 6 families.

References 

Populated places in Izeh County